Moira Armstrong (born 1930) is a Scottish television director whose career has expanded over nearly fifty years.

Born in Crieff and raised in north-east Scotland, Armstrong initially worked in BBC Radio where she trained as a continuity announcer before switching to television.

Her credits include episodes of Armchair Thriller (based on the novel Quiet as a Nun), The Onedin Line, Lark Rise to Candleford, Where the Heart Is, The Bill, Midsomer Murders, Something in Disguise, The Wednesday Play, and Adam Adamant Lives!, the biographical serial Freud (1984) as well as the television film The Countess Alice (1992).

She also directed the 1971 adaptation for television of Lewis Grassic Gibbon's Sunset Song, notable not only for being the first drama to be recorded in colour by BBC Scotland but also featuring its first nude scene.

Armstrong (with Jonathan Powell) won the 1980 BAFTA Best Drama Series/Serial award for Testament of Youth (1979).

Other credits
 Shoulder to Shoulder (and Waris Hussein, 1974)

See also
 List of female film and television directors
 List of LGBT-related films directed by women

References

External links

 interview British Entertainment History Project

1930 births
Living people
Scottish television directors